The Royal Society of Literature Ondaatje Prize is an annual literary award given by the Royal Society of Literature. The £10,000 award is for a work of fiction, non-fiction or poetry that evokes the "spirit of a place", and is written by someone who is a citizen of or who has been resident in the Commonwealth or the Republic of Ireland.

The prize bears the name of its benefactor Sir Christopher Ondaatje. The prize incorporates the Winifred Holtby Memorial Prize, which was presented up to 2002 for regional fiction.

Winners

References

Royal Society of Literature awards
Commonwealth literary awards
Awards established in 2003
2003 establishments in the United Kingdom
British non-fiction literary awards
British fiction awards
P